The 2020–21 BYU Cougars women's soccer team represents BYU during the 2020–21 NCAA Division I women's soccer season. The Cougars are coached for a 26th consecutive season by Jennifer Rockwood, who was co-coach in 1995 and became the solo head coach in 1996. Before 1995 BYU women's soccer competed as a club team and not as a member of the NCAA. Overall the Cougars have made the NCAA tournament in 20 of the 25 seasons that Rockwood has been the head coach. Joining Rockwood as assistant coaches are Brent Anderson (4th season) and Steve Magleby (3rd season) with volunteer assistants Rachel Jorgensen (6th season) and McKinzie Young (8th season). The Cougars came off of a season where they were first in the WCC and went 21–1–1, 8–0–1 in the WCC with the only loss coming to eventual College Cup Champion Stanford. The Cougars were picked to finish as champs by the WCC media. Due to the COVID-19 coronavirus, the women's soccer team practiced during the fall of 2020 and are playing a spring 2021 season with the NCAA Tournament also taking place in spring 2021.

Media

Television & Internet Streaming 
Most BYU women's soccer will have a TV broadcast or internet video stream available. BYUtv and WCC Network (the new name for TheW.tv) will once again serve as the primary providers. Information on these television broadcasts can be found under each individual match.

Nu Skin BYU Sports Network 

For a seventh consecutive season the BYU Sports Network will air BYU Cougars women's soccer games. Greg Wrubell provided play-by-play for most games with Jason Shepherd filling-in when Wrubell had basketball duties. BYU Radio's KUMT station 107.9 FM acted as the flagship stations for women's soccer, though the BYU Sports App carried a few games exclusively.

Affiliates
BYU Radio- KUMT 107.9 FM

Schedule

Preseason

Regular season

Post season

Roster

Rankings

References 

2021 in sports in Utah
2021 West Coast Conference women's soccer spring season
2020-21 team